Ivaylo Vasilev (born 15 January 1991) is a Bulgarian footballer who plays as a goalkeeper.

Career
After starting his career with Lokomotiv Sofia, Vasilev joined the CSKA Sofia academy when he was 7 years old, where he honed his footballing skills. Vasilev then was signed in the 2008–09 season by Levski Sofia.

In January 2017, Vasilev joined Neftochimic Burgas. On 16 June 2017, he moved to Botev Vratsa but left the club in August.

On 1 September 2017, Vasilev signed a two year contract with his former club Montana.

References

External links
 Profile at LevskiSofia.info
 
 

1991 births
Living people
Bulgarian footballers
Bulgaria youth international footballers
Bulgaria under-21 international footballers
PFC Levski Sofia players
PFC Vidima-Rakovski Sevlievo players
FC Septemvri Simitli players
FC Haskovo players
FC Montana players
Neftochimic Burgas players
FC Botev Vratsa players
FC Lokomotiv 1929 Sofia players
First Professional Football League (Bulgaria) players
Second Professional Football League (Bulgaria) players
Association football goalkeepers